Drak Pack is a 1980 animated television series about the classic Universal Monsters villains fighting for good. It aired in the United States on CBS Saturday Morning from September 6 to December 20, 1980. It was produced by the Australian division of Hanna-Barbera.

Premise

The series centers on three young men: Drak Jr., Frankie and Howler, descendants of Count Dracula, the Frankenstein monster, and the Wolf Man. To atone for their ancestors' wrongdoings, the three, united as the Drak Pack, became superheroes.

They appear initially as normal humans. But whenever trouble arises, they strike their right hands together and shout "Wacko!" This is called the Drak Whack. They then transform into a vampire, a Frankenstein monster, and a werewolf, respectively.

Their principal mode of transport is an amphibious flying car which they called "the Drakster".

The Drak Pack's principal opponent is Dr. Dred, a blue-skinned evil genius. His evil organization O.G.R.E. ("The Organization of Generally Rotten Enterprises" or "Endeavours") includes Toad, Fly, Mummyman, and Vampira.

When the Drak Pack needs counsel, they go to Drak's great-great-uncle Count Dracula himself, known to the team as "Big D".

Characters
 Drak Jr. (voiced by Jerry Dexter) - The great-great-grandnephew of Count Dracula and leader of the Drak Pack. Drak's powers include flight, telekinesis, changing shape, and walking on walls. Unlike most cartoon vampires, Drak may assume a variety of forms, although he favors a bat.
 Frankie (voiced by William Callaway) - The descendant of the Frankenstein Monster. Frankie has superhuman strength and can emit electrical charges from the bolts in his neck whenever he gets angry.
 Howler (voiced by William Callaway) - The descendant of the Wolf Man. Howler has an ultrasonic howl and super-breath.
 Count Dracula (voiced by Alan Oppenheimer) - Drak's great-great-granduncle, who the Drak Pack turn to when they need his counsel. The Drak Pack refers to him as "Big D". Count Dracula is the president of the Transylvania Retired Spooks, Spectres, and Spirits Society. He also has a pet spider in the series that often gets injured when Count Dracula is giving the Drak Pack orders.
 OGRE - Short for "The Organization of Generally Rotten Enterprises" or "Endeavours", OGRE is the principal antagonist of the series. OGRE's headquarters is an artificial island called "the Dredquarters", but occasionally called "the Drednought" and "OGRE Island". They travel in an airship that Dr. Dred calls the "Dredgible".
 Dr. Dred (voiced by Hans Conried) - A blue-skinned evil genius and the leader of OGRE.
 Toad (voiced by Don Messick) - Toad is Dr. Dred's toad-like right-hand minion and a member of OGRE. Very often, he unwittingly assists the Drak Pack.
 Fly (voiced by Don Messick) - A humanoid fly and a member of OGRE who buzzes, flies, and walks on ceilings.
 Mummyman (voiced by Chuck McCann) - A large mumbling mummy and a member of OGRE. He has super-strength and can stretch his wrappings indefinitely, often using them to tie up the Drak Pack.
 Vampira (voiced by Julie McWhirter) - Vampira is a female vampire with shape-shifting powers similar to Drak's and a member of OGRE. She has something of an unrequited crush on Drak.

Episodes

Home media
Visual Entertainment released Drak Pack: The Complete Series on DVD in Region 1 (Canada only) on February 5, 2008. On September 6, 2011, VEI (distributed by Millennium Entertainment) released the complete series on DVD in the U.S.

References

External links
 
 Episode guide at the Big Cartoon DataBase
 Drak Pack at Don Markstein's Toonopedia. Archived from the original on May 5, 2016.

1980s American animated television series
1980 American television series debuts
1980 American television series endings
American children's animated action television series
American children's animated adventure television series
American children's animated fantasy television series
American children's animated horror television series
American children's animated superhero television series
1980 Australian television series debuts
1980 Australian television series endings
Australian children's animated action television series
Australian children's animated adventure television series
Australian children's animated fantasy television series
Australian children's animated horror television series
Australian children's animated superhero television series
Television series by Hanna-Barbera
Television series by Endemol Australia
CBS original programming
Works based on Frankenstein
Superhero teams
Vampires in animated television
Television series about werewolves
English-language television shows